Events from the year 1949 in Sweden:

Incumbents
 Monarch – Gustaf V
 Prime Minister – Tage Erlander

Events
The Swedish Building Workers' Union founded

Popular culture

Film
29 August – Flickan från tredje raden released
17 October – Thirst released
9 December – Pippi Longstocking released

Sport
4 to 10 February – the 1949 World Table Tennis Championships were held in Stockholm
12 to 20 February – the 1949 World Ice Hockey Championships were held in Stockholm

Births

2 January – Anders Lidén, Permanent Representative of Sweden to the United Nations
15 February – Thomas Callerud, figure skater
21 February – Ronnie Hellström, footballer (died 2022)
6 April – Janet Ågren, actress
13 May – Eva Eriksson, illustrator and writer 
21 May – Björn Ranelid, writer
9 July – Jan Brunstedt, auto racing driver
19 July – Bo Bernhardsson, politician
16 August – Bo Knape, sailor

Deaths

28 January – Gustaf Nordqvist, composer, church musician and professor (born 1886)
4 March – Karolina Widerström (born 1856)
7 March – David Emanuel Wahlberg, sports writer and editor (born 1882)
9 March – Claes Johanson, wrestler (born 1884)
19 April – Ulrich Salchow, figure skater (born 1877)
22 November – John Ekman, film actor (born 1880)

References

External links

 
Sweden
Years of the 20th century in Sweden